The Black EP is an EP by American rock band Interpol, released in August 2003 by EMI Records. It includes "Say Hello to the Angels" (taken from their debut album, Turn on the Bright Lights), a demo version of "NYC", and four live recordings from the Black Sessions recorded on French radio station Radio France.

Track listing
"Say Hello to the Angels" – 4:27
"NYC (Demo)" – 4:28
"Obstacle 1 (Black Session)" – 4:18
"Specialist (Black Session)" – 6:33
"Leif Erikson (Black Session)" – 3:55
"PDA (Black Session)" – 5:19

Personnel
Paul Banks – vocals, guitar
Daniel Kessler – guitar
Sam Fogarino – drums
Carlos Dengler – bass guitar, keyboards on tracks 1 and 2
Eric Altesleben - keyboards and backing vocals on tracks 3, 4, 5 and 6

Releases

References 

Interpol (band) EPs
2003 EPs